The People's Guard was a pro-Gaddafi organization active in Libya during the 2011 Libyan civil war. It was led by Mansour Dhao.

References

First Libyan Civil War
Paramilitary organizations based in Libya